The Tokyo Concert is a live album by jazz pianist Bill Evans with Eddie Gómez and Marty Morell recorded at the Yūbin Chokin Hall in Tokyo, Japan in 1973 and released on the Fantasy label.

History
The album was Evans's first release for Fantasy Records. Jazz critic Kiyoshi Koyama found that Evans's playing was different, more fresh and colourful. He—and his aficionados—also noted a change in Evans' clothes: black tuxedo, bright pink shirt; "[r]eportedly, this was the first time he had ever chosen such bold colors."  The album includes "Hullo Bolinas", a Steve Swallow composition named after a town in California, which is one of the few Evans' piano solos; Eddie Gomez "brought the tune to Bill's attention just before the trio left for Japan." After the trio played it during a public performance, "Morell expressed the opinion that the number would have greater impact without bass and drums." Evans was convinced by Morell, so he played it alone. This piece was Evans's only piano solo of the whole Japanese tour.

Reception
The Allmusic review by Ken Dryden awarded the album four stars and states "Although this CD doesn't rank among the Top Five live dates recorded by Bill Evans, it should be considered an essential part of his discography".

Track listing
 "Mornin' Glory" (Bobbie Gentry) – 5:17
 "Up with the Lark" (Jerome Kern, Leo Robin) – 6:36
 "Yesterday I Heard the Rain" (Gene Lees, Armando Manzanero) – 6:24
 "My Romance" (Lorenz Hart, Richard Rodgers) – 8:32
 "When Autumn Comes" (Clare Fischer) – 5:54
 "T.T.T.T. (Twelve Tone Tune Two)" (Bill Evans) – 6:22
 "Hullo Bolinas" (Steve Swallow) – 3:46
 "Gloria's Step" (Scott LaFaro) – 7:07
 "On Green Dolphin Street" (Bronisław Kaper, Ned Washington) – 6:38
Recorded at Yūbin Chokin Hall, Tokyo, Japan, January 20, 1973.

Personnel
Bill Evans – piano
Eddie Gómez – bass
Marty Morell – drums

References

Bill Evans live albums
1974 live albums
Fantasy Records live albums